Gmina Gryfów Śląski is an urban-rural gmina (administrative district) in Lwówek Śląski County, Lower Silesian Voivodeship, in south-western Poland.

Neighbouring gminas
Gmina Gryfów Śląski is bordered by the gminas of Leśna, Lubań, Lubomierz, Lwówek Śląski, Mirsk, Nowogrodziec and Olszyna.

Villages
Apart from the town of Gryfów Śląski, the gmina contains the villages of Krzewie Wielkie, Młyńsko, Proszówka, Rząsiny, Ubocze, Wieża and Wolbromów.

Twin towns – sister cities

Gmina Gryfów Śląski is twinned with:
 Bischofswerda, Germany
 Gryfice, Poland
 Raspenava, Czech Republic

References

Gryfow Slaski
Lwówek Śląski County